William Joseph Alexander (born October 9, 1976) is an American writer and academic.

He is an adjunct professor in liberal arts at the Vermont College of Fine Arts, located in Montpelier, Vermont.

He won the annual National Book Award for Young People's Literature recognizing his debut novel, Goblin Secrets, which was published by Margaret K. McElderry Books in 2012. It features an orphaned boy who runs away to search for his lost brother in the magical city of Zombay.

Education
Alexander studied theater and folklore at Oberlin College, located in Oberlin, Ohio; and English at the University of Vermont, located in Burlington, Vermont.

Career
His first published speculative fiction was a seven-page short story, "The Birthday Rooms" (Zahir, Summer 2005), which earned a 2006 Calvino Prize nomination.

Alexander acknowledges that his writing style is influenced by well-known fantasy and mystery authors, including Ursula K. Le Guin, Sir Arthur Conan Doyle, and Susan Cooper. Goblin Secrets has received praise from Alexander's literary heroine Le Guin, author of the Earthsea series, and from Peter S. Beagle, author of The Last Unicorn, and a starred review from Kirkus Reviews.

Alexander plans a series of novels set in Zombay. After the release of Goblin Secrets he told the Enchanted Inkpot, "That place isn't done with me yet. The next Zombay book is about music and shadows. It runs parallel to this one, sharing a few scenes and characters but otherwise unfolding in different parts of the city. Zombay is a big place. Cities are always full of different stories unfolding at once." The first sequel was released March 2013, Ghoulish Song. British editions of both novels were published later that year by the Much-in-Little imprint of Constable & Robinson.

Alexander has noted that Ghoulish Song is "not precisely a sequel ... the two happen at the same time, in the same city, and involve several of the same characters, but the books also stand alone. You can see them unfold in the background of each other, if you look."

Selected works

 "The Birthday Rooms", Zahir #7, Summer 2005, pp. 6–12 – his speculative fiction debut
 "A Revisionist History of Earthsea" (essay), Strange Horizons, October 2008
 Goblin Secrets (Margaret K. McElderry, 2012)
 Ghoulish Song (McElderry, 2013)

References

External links

  – Biography
 
 

Place of birth missing (living people)
1976 births
21st-century American novelists
American children's writers
American fantasy writers
American male novelists
Living people
Minneapolis College of Art and Design faculty
National Book Award for Young People's Literature winners
Oberlin College alumni
University of Vermont alumni
Writers from Minneapolis
American writers of Cuban descent
21st-century American male writers
Novelists from Minnesota